William B. Greene Jr. Stadium is a football stadium on the campus of East Tennessee State University (ETSU) in Johnson City, Tennessee.  The stadium is named after businessman and longtime ETSU supporter William B. Greene Jr. Located on the southwestern corner of campus at the foot of Buffalo Mountain, the new stadium is expected to have a seated capacity of over 7,000, plus standing room for an additional 3,000, and cost roughly $26.615 million. The stadium is home to the newly resumed East Tennessee State Buccaneers football team, which played their 2015 and 2016 seasons at Kermit Tipton Stadium on the campus of Science Hill High School.

Team success
Through the 2022 season, the East Tennessee State Buccaneers have posted a 21-7 record at home.

See also
 List of NCAA Division I FCS football stadiums

References

External links
ETSU Football Stadium official website

East Tennessee State Buccaneers football venues
College football venues
Johnson City, Tennessee
American football venues in Tennessee
Sports venues completed in 2017
2017 establishments in Tennessee